KOKZ (105.7 FM) is a radio station serving the Waterloo and Cedar Rapids metropolitan areas with a classic hits format which includes a diverse playlist of music from the late 1960s to the early 1990s. It broadcasts on FM frequency 105.7 MHz and is under ownership of Cedar Rapids-based NRG Media.

The station signed on in 1962 as KXEL-FM, and in 1979 was given the callsign KCNB. The station has been known as KOKZ since 1985.

The station originally broadcast a CHR/Top 40 format and then programmed an adult contemporary format for several years in the 1990s.  It switched to oldies in the late 1990s and adopted the current classic hits format in approximately 2007.

Syndicated programs currently airing on KOKZ include classic "American Top 40" rebroadcasts from the 1970s and 1980s.  As of 2020, the station also airs "Absolutely '80s," hosted by former MTV VJ Nina Blackwood.

Previous logo
 (KOKZ's logo under previous "Cool 105.7" branding)

External links
KOKZ official website

OKZ
NRG Media radio stations